Felipe Ribeiro dos Santos, commonly known as Felipe (born 5 October 1978), is a professional futsal player who plays for Araz Naxçivan and the Azerbaijan national futsal team.

References

External links
UEFA profile

1978 births
Living people
Azerbaijani men's futsal players
Brazilian men's futsal players
Brazilian expatriate sportspeople in Azerbaijan